The Fire Fighters may refer to: 

 The Fire Fighters (1927 film), 1927 American action film serial directed by Jacques Jaccard
 The Fire Fighters (1930 film), 1930 Mickey Mouse animated cartoon